Programme Yarrow is a British government contingency plan to deal with possible nationwide power blackouts. The plan includes scenarios where power supply is severely compromised for up to a week. The plan was originally developed in 2021 to address the possibility of a major failure of the  National Grid.

The plan was stress tested by government in late 2022 to deal with possible outages caused by fuel shortages as a consequence of the 2022 Russian invasion of Ukraine. Another exercise, Noble Birch, had been conducted in previous months to test the practicality of government continuity in the absence of power.

Focus of the programme 
The programme primarily focuses on how to supply food and water to the young and elderly, how to establish communication with citizens, and how to manage the crisis with planned blackouts if the nation indeed goes to the brink of a nation-wide blackout for a week. The government and local councils had already taken part in a series of drills to stress-test the plan of supplying food and water.

According to Programme Yarrow, digital radios would stop functioning in the case of a week-long power outage and only the analogue ones would work. Local radio stations won't have the necessary resources to function through a week-long blackout. The BBC's Radio 2 and Radio 4 would be the only radio stations that would be able to broadcast in such a scenario. If the energy crisis becomes too severe, the government may resort to 3-hour rolling blackouts.

References 

Emergency management in the United Kingdom